Piabina is a genus of characins from tropical South America.

Species
There are currently 3 recognized species in this genus:
 Piabina anhembi J. F. P. da Silva & Kaefer, 2003
 Piabina argentea J. T. Reinhardt, 1867
 Piabina thomasi (Fowler, 1940)

References

Characidae
Fish of South America